Beau Vallon is a bay on the north western coast of Mahé in the Seychelles.  Beau Vallon Beach is well-frequented and is possibly the most popular beach on the island. It is a base for diving and snorkelling due to its clear waters and coral reefs. Beau Vallon has several hotels and restaurants.

References

External links
 Beau Vallon Beach Travel blog with information about Beau Vallon

Populated places in Seychelles
Districts of Seychelles
Mahé, Seychelles